K. Rajan is an Indian politician and Minister for Land Revenue, Survey and Land Records, Land Reforms, Housing, Government of Kerala. He is a member of Communist Party of India. He is a legislator from Ollur Assembly constituency. 
 He was the Chief Whip of the first Pinarayi Vijayan Ministry. He is also a member of the Kerala State Executive Committee of Communist Party of India and national secretary of All India Youth Federation.

Personal life 
Son of Shri P. Krishnankutti Menon and Smt. K. Remani; born at Anthikad on 26 May 1973. He is married to Smt. Anupama N.

Political career
State Secretary, AISF Kerala & AIYF Kerala

Vice President, AISF National

Secretary, AIYF National

Executive Member, CPI Kerala

Council Member, CPI National

MLA, Ollur Legislative Assembly (2011-16; 2016-)

Chief Whip, Kerala Legislative Assembly

Minister, Kerala State

References

External links 
Roshy Augustine and K Rajan—Once classmates, now Cabinet colleagues 
Chief Whip last time, minister now...
 

Living people
1973 births
Kerala MLAs 2016–2021
Communist Party of India politicians from Kerala
Place of birth missing (living people)
Politicians from Thrissur